Two to the Fifth is the 32nd book in the Xanth series by Piers Anthony.

Plot

External links 

 Two to the Fifth and the Xanth series at the website

 32
2008 American novels
Novels about magic
Tor Books books